KROQ-FM (106.7 MHz) is a commercial radio station licensed to Pasadena, California, serving Greater Los Angeles. Owned by Audacy, Inc., it broadcasts an alternative rock format known as "The World Famous KROQ" (pronounced "kay-rock").

The station has studios at the intersection of Venice Boulevard and Fairfax Avenue in the Crestview neighborhood in West Los Angeles. The transmitter is based in the Verdugo Mountains. It was the flagship station of Kevin and Bean (revamped as Kevin in the Mornings in 2019) and former show Loveline, hosted originally by Jim "The Poorman" Trenton with Dr. Drew Pinsky, and later by "Psycho" Mike Catherwood with Pinsky.

History

KPPC

On April 23, 1962, KPPC-FM signed on at 106.7 MHz. It was owned by the Pasadena Presbyterian Church as a companion to its KPPC, a limited-hours AM radio station that had broadcast since 1924.

In 1967, the Pasadena Presbyterian Church sold KPPC-AM-FM to Crosby-Avery Broadcasting for $310,000. The church had been attempting to sell the radio stations for a year; station manager Edgar Pierce said the church found commercial radio incompatible with the noncommercial nature of its other efforts. Crosby-Avery was owned by Leon Crosby, a general manager of San Francisco's KMPX, a station that had just gone to a full-time freeform progressive rock format, and Lewis Avery, former partner in a national ad sales firm. With KMPX soaring to success but KPPC, with its middle-of-the-road format, ailing, Crosby and Avery brought in the architects of KMPX, Tom and Raechel Donahue, to turn around their new station in Southern California.

Hosts during KPPC's "underground" format included B. Mitchel Reed, Tom Donahue, Les Carter, Ed Mitchell, Steven Clean, Outrageous Nevada, novelty music historian Dr. Demento, Charles Laquidara, Elliot Mintz, blues archivist Johnny Otis, Barbara Birdfeather, and more.

In 1969, Crosby sold KPPC-AM-FM and KMPX to the National Science Network for $1.2 million. Crosby used the funds to buy a then-silent San Francisco television station, KEMO-TV. National Science Network's management of the KPPC stations was turbulent, capped by an October 1971 mass firing of the air staff, but the period also included technical upgrades. NSN moved the studios out of the church basement and to 99 Chester Street in Pasadena and the transmitter to Flint Peak, with a slight power increase to 25,700 watts.

In 1971, Ludwig Wolfgang Frohlich, founder of the National Science Network and previous owner of an ad agency, died. Upon his death, control of the estate was transferred to Ingrid and Thomas Burns.

KROQ AM and KROQ-FM

Beginnings and brief closing (1972–1974)
Country music station KBBQ (1500 AM) in Burbank became KROQ in September 1972, changing its format to Top 40 and hiring established disc jockeys from other stations. The new KROQ called itself "K-ROCK, the ROQ of Los Angeles". In 1973, with National Science Network's estate selling off its assets, KROQ's owners bought KPPC-AM-FM (immediately divesting the AM station to meet then-current ownership limits), changed the calls to KROQ-FM and hired Shadoe Stevens to create a new rock format described as high-energy "all-cutting-edge-rock-all-the-time" and began simulcasting as "The ROQs of L.A.: Mother Rock!" Meanwhile, KPPC on 1240 AM was sold to Universal Broadcasting, a religious broadcaster, and remained on the air with its limited-schedule of Wednesday evening and Sunday operation until subsequent owners took the station off the air permanently in 1996.

The two stations (KROQ AM/FM) were wildly successful initially with the new format, but poor money management plagued the enterprise. When concert promoter Ken Roberts booked Sly and the Family Stone and Sha Na Na for one KROQ-sponsored show at the Los Angeles Coliseum and the station found itself unable to cover expenses, Roberts agreed to pay for the band to play the show in exchange for a small ownership stake in the station. Roberts joined a sprawling ownership group which included a doctor, two dairymen, a political lobbyist, a secretary, and several other minor investors. Roberts, with his background in the music industry, made him a logical choice for president of the struggling company in the minds of the other shareholders, and he was elected such at the first meeting he attended in 1974.

By 1974, the station's finances were already untenable following a year of commercial-free programming — a stunt implemented in an effort to gain market share. The stations' debt load reached $7 million; paychecks began to bounce and Shadoe Stevens and the bulk of the staff walked out, shutting the stations down. The closure would last for nearly two years.

Rebirth and increasing popularity (1975–1989)
In late 1975, the FCC ordered KROQ to return to the airwaves or surrender the stations' licenses. With barebones equipment, KROQ returned to the airwaves, broadcasting initially from the transmitter location, followed by a penthouse suite in the Pasadena Hilton Hotel, then again across the street from the Hilton (117 S. Los Robles).

Ken Roberts returned to the reborn station in a more forceful ownership role, buying out his partners one by one until he remained the sole owner of the station.

KROQ's rebirth was simultaneous with the emergence of punk rock in the late 1970s and new wave, and KROQ quickly became the voice of the burgeoning Los Angeles punk and new wave scene. Disc jockey Rodney Bingenheimer introduced many new bands on his show. As punk expanded its hold on the music scene during the mid to late 1970s, and KROQ steadily adding more of it to their freeform format, this cemented their place in the Los Angeles market.

In 1979, Shadoe Stevens once again left the station, with Rick Carroll taking over as program director, and took all of the new music and combined it in a Top 40 formatic structure. By 1980, the station had fully committed to a post-new wave modern rock orientation. KROQ became an even greater success as the "Rock of the 80s" evolved. During that decade, the station mixed punk rock, such as The Ramones, The Clash, The Weirdos,  Fear, The Pandoras and X, with new wave, such as U2, Oingo Boingo, Talking Heads, The Police, The Cars, Devo, Sparks, Berlin, Duran Duran, Pet Shop Boys, Blondie, ska and similar genres with artists such as English Beat, Fine Young Cannibals and 60s underground rocker Iggy Pop, and huge mainstream artists such as The Beach Boys and The Rolling Stones. It was also not uncommon for certain KROQ dee-jays to play then-current hip hop and soul/funk artists such as Arrested Development, Prince and Parliament/Funkadelic.

By 1982, Billboard Magazine reported that KROQ Arbitron numbers of 3.7 were closing in on AOR leaders KMET at 4.0 and KLOS at 3.9.  

Carroll, as a consultant, took the "Rock of the 80s" format to other stations, including 91X in San Diego, KOEU in Palm Springs, California, KMGN FM in Bakersfield, California, The Quake in San Francisco and KYYX in Seattle, among a few others on the US West Coast in the 1980s.

In 1986, KROQ was purchased at a then-record $45 million by Infinity Broadcasting. By the late 1980s, the station had started dipping in the ratings. New wave had declined in popularity and electronic dance bands, such as Depeche Mode and New Order, started getting more airplay on the station. Also during this period, KROQ began focusing on college rock (or so-called alternative rock) by adding bands into their playlist such as R.E.M., the Red Hot Chili Peppers, The Psychedelic Furs, Echo & the Bunnymen, The Replacements, Camper Van Beethoven, Jane's Addiction, the Pixies, The Alarm, The Cult, Violent Femmes, Love and Rockets, Dramarama and Social Distortion, as well as heavier acts like Faith No More and Living Colour and guitar-oriented hip-hop groups like Run-DMC and the Beastie Boys.

KROQ in the 1990s and continued popularity (1990–1999)
Throughout the 1990s, KROQ's format focused on mainly alternative rock (or alternative metal), grunge, punk pop, Britpop, industrial music and nu metal, giving up-and-coming bands their first exposure on the station or in Southern California, including Nirvana, Red Hot Chili Peppers, The Smashing Pumpkins, Pearl Jam, Nine Inch Nails, Oasis, Foo Fighters, Green Day, The Offspring, Sublime, No Doubt, Rage Against the Machine, Korn, Bad Religion, Weezer, Blink-182, Jimmy Eat World, Hole, Garbage, Lenny Kravitz and System of a Down. They also began adding heavier acts to their playlists such as Metallica, who were staples on the Long Beach heavy metal radio station KNAC, formerly an alternative/new wave/punk rock radio station. These helped the station surge back to number one in the ratings, for which it remained until the mid-2000s, when it slipped to the middle-of-the-pack, ratings-wise, for Los Angeles area radio stations.

The 1990s also saw a continuation of the weekday morning Kevin & Bean Show, as well as "Rodney on the Roq," hosted by Rodney Bingenheimer, on Sunday nights. In late nights, the station aired Loveline, hosted by "The Poorman" Jim Trenton and Dr. Drew Pinsky. The show's purpose was to bring correct information regarding human sexuality and relationships to those 13 to 25 years of age. KROQ also began its own festivals Almost Acoustic Christmas and Weenie Roast, which had taken place every year since 1990 and 1993 respectively, and there have been no editions of either of those festivals since 2019, due to the COVID-19 pandemic.

In 1997, KROQ/Infinity merged with CBS, later changing its name to CBS Radio.

"Confess Your Crime" Hoax (June, 1990)
In June of 1990, Kevin and Bean secretly arranged for a friend to pretend to confess to killing his girlfriend during their "Confess Your Crime" segment.  The hoax resulted in investigations by the Sheriff's Department, the FCC, NBC’s "Unsolved Mysteries" and other news media. The hoax was exposed 10 months later after KROQ had unknowingly hired the caller, Doug "the Slug" Roberts, as a DJ and the three were heard talking about the hoax on a monitored phone line at KROQ. Kevin and Bean paid the Sheriff's Department $12,170 for the cost of the investigation, and performed 149 hours of community service to compensate for the 149 hours the homicide detective spent on the case.  KROQ received a letter of reprimand from the FCC for the incident; the lightest punishment the FCC could give.

Later history (2000–2016)
Originally located at 117 S. Los Robles Avenue in Pasadena, the station moved to 3500 W. Olive Avenue in Burbank in 1987 as part of the purchase agreement and to be closer to the music industry. In 2002, the station was moved to a facility at 5901 Venice Boulevard in the Crestview neighborhood in West Los Angeles.

Unlike most other (Class B, but with grandfathered greater than B facilities) FM stations in Los Angeles whose transmitters are atop Mount Wilson, KROQ's (Class B) transmitter is located on Tongva Peak in Glendale at an altitude of 2,650 ft., which results in somewhat weaker signal coverage.

KROQ's format had varied throughout the 2000s and 2010s. The radio station's format had repeated much of the same formula as the 1990s, mixing heavier acts like Linkin Park, Staind, P.O.D., Seether, Velvet Revolver, Cold and Saliva, with punk rock like Rise Against, Sum 41, AFI, Fall Out Boy, My Chemical Romance, Jimmy Eat World, Panic! at the Disco and Thrice, and with alternative/indie/garage rock acts such as Muse, Queens of the Stone Age, The Strokes, The Bravery, Arcade Fire and The Killers. This new crop of rock acts found considerable popularity on the radio station while sharing airspace with KROQ veterans like Nirvana, Red Hot Chili Peppers, Metallica, Foo Fighters, Weezer, Green Day, The Offspring, Blink-182, No Doubt, System of a Down, Korn, Jane's Addiction, the Beastie Boys, Sublime, Bad Religion, Stone Temple Pilots, Incubus, Nine Inch Nails, Social Distortion and Cypress Hill.

In 2004, KROQ began broadcasting in HD Radio. On February 20, 2006, KROQ added streaming music from the radio station to its website. On June 9, 2006, KROQ launched an HD sub-carrier, KROQ HD-2, which airs new wave and alternative tracks from the 1980s which were popular during KROQ's heyday (and is also branded "KROQ 2: Roq of the 80s").

In February 2010, CBS Radio, which controlled the live stream, blocked access for listeners outside of the United States.

Steve Jones came to KROQ from Indie 103.1 with a Sunday night show called "Jonesy's Jukebox", which ran from 7 to 9PM during 2010–2013 before moving to KLOS.

In February 2015, KROQ severed ties with Boyd "Doc on the Roq" Britton and Lisa May after deciding to drop news and traffic. The news came as a shock for longtime listeners as Doc on the Roq had been reporting news for the station for 27 years while Lisa May had been reporting traffic for the past 24 years. Fans took to Facebook to boycott the station for not renewing their contracts.

Although considered one of the legendary radio stations in the country and still a strong revenue generator for parent company CBS, ratings for KROQ have been rather depressed over the last couple of years. In fact, competitor KYSR moved ahead of KROQ in 2015 including a 3.4 to 2.3 lead in the most recent August 2016 Nielsen ratings.

Management and audience changes (2017–present) 
On February 2, 2017, CBS Radio announced it would merge with Entercom. The merger was approved on November 9, 2017, and was consummated on November 17.

On March 18, 2020, Kevin Ryder announced on Twitter that he, Allie MacKay, Jensen Karp, producer Dave Sanchez and contributor Jonathan Kantrowe, had all been let go from the morning show. The show would be replaced by afternoon hosts Ted Stryker and Kevin Klein. In September 2020, the show would be added on sister stations KVIL in Dallas, KITS in San Francisco, and KRBZ in Kansas City via syndication as part of a company initiative to expand networked programming among the company's alternative stations due to COVID-19 pandemic-related cutbacks and layoffs.

The firing of Ryder marked a new chapter for KROQ under the leadership of brand manager Mike Kaplan. Kaplan previously served as program director of iHeartMedia's KYSR from 2013  to 2018. He was responsible for re-branding the station to "Alt 98-7," a moniker that eventually became commonplace for the format. He also hired Jeff "Woody" Fife for mornings in 2014. By April 2021, Fife and his morning show reached #1 among persons 18-49 and 25–54, both demographics most coveted by advertisers. 2014 was the last year Kevin & Bean were the #1 morning show in Los Angeles.

After a 28-year run at the station, Senior VP of Programming Kevin Weatherly exited the station to start a new role as Spotify's new Head of North American Programming. Kaplan replaced Weatherly at KROQ in February 2020.

By the end of the Weatherly era, KROQ had essentially shifted to a classic alternative format that leaned heavily on heritage acts. Weatherly added new titles to the playlist very conservatively. Kaplan's strategy differed from Weatherly's; he immediately shifted the playlist to focus on alternative pop, with heavy airplay of artists including Billie Eilish, Machine Gun Kelly, Post Malone, Powfu, 24kGoldn, Beabadoobee and Dominic Fike. The station also decreased airplay of most 1990s and 2000s alternative titles and artists that defined the station during its heyday, including System of a Down and Muse. The changes drew ire from cultural critics and former KROQ on-air talent, followed by a steep ratings decline.

During this period, Kaplan mandated that all on-air talent no longer refer to the station as "K-Rock," but rather use the call letters "K-R-O-Q." The station paused most street team marketing promotions and festivals, including Weenie Roast and Almost Acoustic Christmas, due to the COVID-19 pandemic. KROQ's ratings continue to be challenged.

After 22 years on KROQ, Ted Stryker exited the "Stryker & Klein" morning show on July 6, 2021. The morning show would change its name to "Klein and Ally" at this time. On February 1, 2022, Stryker officially joined Chris Booker on crosstown rival KYSR for afternoon drive.

Weatherly would return to KROQ as Senior Vice President of Programming in May 2022. Since then, the station has greatly reduced its focus on alternative pop and has increased airplay of classic alternative tracks from the 1990s and 2000s. The station also returned to its pre-2020 logo and is again referring to itself as "K-Rock" on the air.

Awards
The station was awarded Radio Station of the Year in 1992 and 1993 by Rolling Stone magazine readers poll issues.

In 2007, the station was nominated for the top 25 markets Alternative station of the year award by Radio & Records magazine.
Other nominees included WBCN in Boston, Massachusetts; KTBZ-FM in Houston, Texas; KITS in San Francisco, California; KNDD in Seattle, Washington; and WWDC in Washington, DC.

KROQ was the recipient of an Alternate Contraband Award for Major Market Radio Alternative Radio Station of the Year 2012.

KROQ was inducted into the Rock Radio Hall of Fame in 2014.

HD Radio
KROQ broadcasts a second HD Radio subchannel, with KROQ-HD2 airing The ROQ of the 80's, which features classic rock from the 1980s. In August 2018, Entercom announced it would re-launch the subchannel, adding former KROQ personalities Freddy Snakeskin and Tami Heide as DJs. In 2020, KROQ activated an HD3 subchannel, which aired a new alternative rock format branded as "New Arrivals."  On September 23, 2022, the HD3 channel was dropped from the broadcast lineup entirely.

Notable staff
 Rodney Bingenheimer (1976–2017)
 Richard Blade (1982–2000)
 Jed the Fish (Edwin "Jed" Gould, III), week-day drive time show, (1978–84, 1985–2011)
 Adam Carolla, Loveline, "Mr. Birchum" on the morning drive time Kevin and Bean Show (1995–2005)
 Carson Daly (1996)
 Raechel Donahue (1980–86)
 Ralph Garman (1997 – November 30, 2017)
 Mark Goodman (1990s)
 Chris Hardwick (1994–98)
 Tami Heide (1991–2004) (2018-2022 HD2)
 J. J. Jackson (1987)
 Kevin and Bean (1990–2020)
 Jimmy Kimmel "Jimmy the Sports Guy" on the morning show (1994–99)
 "Spacin'" Scott Mason (1979–2000), former Director of Engineering; West Coast at CBS Radio
 Frank Murphy, producer of Kevin and Bean
 Kennedy (1991–92)
 Cassandra Peterson "Elvira Mistress of the ROQ" (1982–83)
 Dr. Drew Pinsky, Loveline
 Riki Rachtman, Loveline (1993–96)
 Frazer Smith (1976–80)
 Matt "Money" Smith "KROQ Sports Guy" (1994–2005)
 Shadoe Stevens (1973–80) First air personality and founding program director.
 Stryker
 Jim Trenton "The Poor Man", creator and host of Loveline. He hosted the show for many years with co-host Dr. Drew Pinsky (1982–93)
 Ian Whitcomb (Weekends – early 1980s)
 Stanley Sheff (early 1980s)

Festivals
 KROQ Almost Acoustic Christmas, first held in December 1989. The festival was initially called KROQ Xmas Bash. Due to the COVID-19 pandemic, there were no editions of the Almost Acoustic Christmas between 2019 to 2021.
 KROQ Weenie Roast, first held in June 1993; however, this festival had been presented in May from 2005 to 2009 and again from 2012 to 2018. Due to the COVID-19 pandemic, there have been no editions of the Weenie Roast since 2019.
 KROQ LA Invasion, held from 2001 to 2007.
 Epicenter, held from 2009 to 2015, although there was no 2014 edition of this festival.

KROQ-related albums
 KROQ Calendar & New Music, a compilation of new singles that premiered in the subsequent year (1995–present)
 Rodney on the ROQ, Vol. 1 a classic punk compilation from KROQ's Rodney Bingenheimer
 Rodney on the ROQ Volume 2 more good punk from KROQ's Rodney Bingenheimer
 Rodney on the ROQ Vol III even more punk from KROQ's Rodney Bingenheimer
 At KROQ, a CD-single by Morrissey
 On KROQ's Loveline, CD by Hagfish
 The Best of KROQ's Almost Acoustic Christmas (1999), a compilation of concerts recorded at the Acoustic Christmas
 Kevin & Bean's Super Christmas (2006)
 Kevin & Bean's Christmastime In The 909 (2004)
 Kevin and Bean: The Year They Recalled Santa Claus (2003)
 Kevin and Bean: Fo' Shizzle St. Nizzle (2002)
 Kevin and Bean: Swallow My Eggnog (2001)
 Kevin and Bean: The Real Slim Santa (2000)
 Kevin and Bean: Last Christmas (1999)
 Kevin and Bean: Santa's Swingin' Sack (1998)
 Kevin and Bean: A Family Christmas in Your Ass (1997)
 Kevin and Bean: Christmastime in the LBC (1996) – cassette tape
 Kevin and Bean: How the Juice Stole Christmas (1995) – cassette tape
 Kevin and Bean: No Toys for OJ (1994) – cassette tape
 Kevin and Bean: Santa Claus, Schamanta Claus (1993) – cassette tape
 Kevin and Bean: We've Got Your Yule Logs Hangin''' (1992) – cassette tape
 Kevin and Bean: Bogus Christmas (1991) – cassette tape
 Kevin and Bean: Feel the Warmth of Kevin and Bean's Wonderful World of Christmas (The White Album) (1990) – LP
 KROQ Locals Only Vol. 1 (2019) 
 Kroqing in Pasadena, a single from XTC (198?)
 Richard Blade's Flashback Favorites, Volumes 1–6 (1993)

See also
KROQ Top 106.7 Countdowns

Further reading

References

External links

 History of KROQ 1968–1979
KROQ: An Oral History
List of KROQ Top 106.7 countdowns with a searchable archive
KROQ/KPPC Reunion held August 4, 2001. Mainly just pictures available.
Listing of Former KROQ/KPPC jocks and info on where they are now
Pictorial tour of the transmitter facility on Verdugo Peak
Collection of KROQ jingles from the 70s and ROQ of the 80s
Collection of KROQ jingles from the 70s and ROQ of the 80s
Listen to KROQ online

KPPC
An article about KPPC by former KPPC disc jockey Ted Alvy
An article about KPPC Radio 106.7 FM
An article about KPPC AM 1240
KPPC REVISITED

ROQ-FM
Modern rock radio stations in the United States
Radio stations established in 1962
1962 establishments in California
New wave radio stations
Audacy, Inc. radio stations